Mill Springs, Kentucky is an unincorporated community in Wayne County, Kentucky.  The area includes springs and the Mill Springs Mill, a watermill built in 1877 which is listed on the National Register of Historic Places.

There are said to be 13 springs, and the springs were discovered by Daniel Boone, who suggested that it was a good site for a mill.

References

Unincorporated communities in Kentucky
Unincorporated communities in Wayne County, Kentucky